Sampaio is a municipality in the state of Tocantins, Brazil.

Sampaio may also refer to:

People

Brazilians 
 Anderson Gils de Sampaio (born 1977), former football player
 Ângelo Sampaio Benedetti (born 1981), football player 
 Augusto Sampaio, computer scientist
 César Sampaio (born 1968), former football player and currently a football director
 Georgina Pires Sampaio (1917–1985), dancer better known as Suzy King
 Olinto Sampaio Rubini (1934–2012), football player
 Philipe Sampaio (born 1994), football player
 Plínio de Arruda Sampaio (1930–2014), politician
 Rogério Sampaio (born 1967), judoka
 Teodoro Fernandes Sampaio (1855–1937), Brazilian engineer, geographer and historiographer
 Tercio Sampaio Ferraz Jr., jurist and writer
 Paulo Henrique Sampaio Filho, better known as Paulinho, Brazilian footballer
 Pedro Sampaio (born 1997), singer and music producer

Portuguese 
 António Rodrigues Sampaio (1806–1882), politician
 António de Sampaio da Nóvoa, psychologist and professor
 Caetano Luís Pequito de Almeida Sampaio (born 1957), career diplomat
 Carlos Sampaio Garrido (1883–1960), diplomat
 Gonçalo Sampaio (1865–1937), botanist
 Helena Sampaio (born 1973), runner
 Jorge Sampaio (1939–2021), lawyer, politician and former President of Portugal
 Lopo Vaz de Sampaio (c. 1480–1534), politician and sailor
 Nélson Sampaio (born 1992), football player
 Rui Sampaio (born 1987), football player
 Sara Sampaio (born 1991), model

Places in Brazil 
 General Sampaio, a municipality in the state of Ceará
 Sampaio, Rio de Janeiro, a neighborhood in the municipality of Rio de Janeiro

Sport in Brazil 
 Estádio Mauro Sampaio, the home stadium of the football team Icasa
 Grêmio Atlético Sampaio, a football team from Boa Vista, Roraima
 Sampaio Corrêa Futebol Clube, a football team from São Luís, Maranhão
 Sampaio Corrêa Futebol e Esporte, a football team from Saquarema, Rio de Janeiro

Portuguese-language surnames